Eva Myrtelle (Fling) Roush (1886–1954) was an American botanist noted for her study of Sidalcea and her work at the Arnold Arboretum. In 1930, she received her doctorate degree in botany from Washington University in St. Louis.

References 

1886 births
1954 deaths
American women scientists
American botanists
Washington University in St. Louis alumni